Shalin Bhanot (born 15 November 1983) is an Indian actor who works in Hindi television. He started his career as a contestant in Roadies 2 and has since acted in various serials and web shows. He participated in dance reality Nach Baliye 4 and emerged as the winner with his now ex-wife Dalljiet Kaur. He then participated in reality series Bigg Boss 16 where he finished as a finalist.

Personal life
Bhanot married actress Dalljiet Kaur in 2009. In 2014, the couple had their first child, a boy, Jayden. In 2015, Kaur filed for divorce and accused Bhanot of domestic violence. She claimed that he never even visited the doctor with her while she was pregnant. She stated that he accused her of trying to influence the doctors and didn't even want her to have a C-Section. Kaur added that Bhanot was violent towards her even in front of her parents from the start of their marriage. They got divorced in 2015 with Kaur keeping Jayden but Bhanot having visiting rights.

Career
Bhanot started his career in 2004 with reality show MTV Roadies 2 as contestant. He then seen played Akshay in Ayushmaan (2005). From 2005–06 he was seen playing Karan in Saat Phere: Saloni Ka Safar on Zee TV and as Mihir in Sanya. He then appeared as Agni in Kulvaddhu on Sony TV. He made a cameo appearance on Kaajjal and starred in Star Plus's Grihasti. In 2009, bhanot participated in StarPlus dance reality show Nach Baliye 4 along with his former wife Daljeet Kaur and emerged as the winner of the show. He has been trained by Hollywood acting coach Michelle Danner.

From October 2022 to February 2023, he was seen participating in Colors TV's reality show Bigg Boss 16, where he finished as a finalist at the fifth position.

Filmography

Films

Television

Special appearances

Web series

References

External links

 
 
 

Living people
Indian male soap opera actors
Indian male film actors
Nach Baliye winners
Punjabi people
Punjabi Hindus
People from Jabalpur
1982 births